John Logan Jenkins III (born March 6, 1991) is an American professional basketball player for the NBA G League Ignite of the NBA G League. A shooting guard, Jenkins was a two-time TSSAA Class AA Mr. Basketball selection, and was the Gatorade Tennessee High School Player of the Year in 2008–09. He played college basketball at Vanderbilt. He was drafted with the 23rd pick in the 2012 NBA draft by the Atlanta Hawks.

High school career
As a senior at Station Camp High School, Jenkins was the nation's leading scorer for high schoolers, averaging 42.3 points per game, finishing second on the state's single-season list behind Ronnie Schmitz, who averaged 44.2 points at Ridgeway High School in 1988–89.

Considered a five-star recruit by Rivals.com, Jenkins was listed as the No. 6 shooting guard and the No. 15 player in the nation in 2008.

College career
One of the nation's top shooters, Jenkins shot 48.3% (72-149) from three in his freshman season at Vanderbilt, 40.8% (100-245) as a sophomore, and 43.9% (134-305) from beyond-the-arc as a junior. As a sophomore, he led the Southeastern Conference in scoring (19.5) and in 3-point field goals made per game (3.1) and finished second in free throw percentage (.894) and was picked to the Fifth Team All-America by Fox Sports. As a junior, he averaged 19.9 points per game, leading the SEC for the second consecutive season (the first time since LSU's Ronnie Henderson did it in 1995–96). He also tied an SEC single-season record for threes made in a season with 134. He led the nation in three-pointers made per game (3.9) and was named a third-team All-American by the Associated Press.

On April 9, 2012, Jenkins announced that he would forgo his final year of eligibility at Vanderbilt to enter the 2012 NBA draft.

College statistics

|-
| style="text-align:left;"|2009–10
| style="text-align:left;"|Vanderbilt
| 31 || 7 || 23.1 || .470 || .483 || .800 || 2.2 || 1.0 || .5 || .2 || 11.0
|-
| style="text-align:left;"|2010–11
| style="text-align:left;"|Vanderbilt
| 32 || 32 || 34.5 || .462 || .408 || .894 || 3.0 || 1.2 || .8 || .3 || 19.5
|-
| style="text-align:left;"|2011–12
| style="text-align:left;"|Vanderbilt
| 35 || 35 || 33.6 || .474 || .439 || .837 || 2.9 || 1.2 || .8 || .3 || 19.9
|-
| style="text-align:center;" colspan="2"|Career || 98 || 74 || 30.6 || .468 || .438 || .856 || 2.7 || 1.1 || .7 || .3 || 16.9
|}

Professional career

Atlanta Hawks (2012–2015)
Jenkins was selected by the Atlanta Hawks with the 23rd overall pick in the 2012 NBA draft. On July 10, 2012, he signed his rookie scale contract with the Hawks and joined them for the 2012 NBA Summer League. On December 1, 2012, he was assigned to the Bakersfield Jam of the NBA Development League. On December 5, 2012, he was recalled by the Hawks.

In July 2013, Jenkins re-joined the Hawks for the 2013 NBA Summer League. On October 31, 2013, the Hawks exercised their third-year team option on Jenkins' rookie scale contract, extending the contract through the 2014–15 season. On December 6, 2013, he was reassigned to the Bakersfield Jam. On December 13, he was recalled by the Hawks. Shortly after being recalled, Jenkins was deactivated due to lower back pain. On February 3, 2014, the Hawks announced Jenkins underwent successful surgery on his back and subsequently missed the rest of the 2013–14 season.

In July 2014, Jenkins re-joined the Hawks for the 2014 NBA Summer League. On October 30, 2014, the Hawks declined to exercise Jenkins' four-year team option and thus allowing him to become an unrestricted free agent in 2015. On November 28, 2014, he was assigned to the Fort Wayne Mad Ants. On December 30, 2014, using the flexible assignment rule, the Hawks assigned Jenkins to the Idaho Stampede, the affiliate of the Utah Jazz. On January 20, 2015, he was recalled by the Hawks.

Dallas Mavericks (2015–2016)
On July 24, 2015, Jenkins signed with the Dallas Mavericks. On October 29, in just his second game for the Mavericks, Jenkins recorded 17 points, 6 rebounds and 3 assists as a starter in a loss to the Los Angeles Clippers. On February 22, 2016, he was waived by the Mavericks.

Phoenix Suns (2016–2017)
On February 24, 2016, Jenkins was claimed off waivers by the Phoenix Suns. The Suns inherited Jenkins' three-year contract with non-guaranteed years of $1.05 million for 2016–17 and $1.18 million for 2017–18. He made his debut for the Suns the following day, scoring two points in four minutes off the bench against the Brooklyn Nets. During his first season with the Suns, he averaged 5.0 points and a career-high 1.2 assists per game.

On October 24, 2016, Jenkins was retained by the Suns for the 2016–17 season. On January 6, 2017, he was waived by the Suns after making four appearances in the 2016–17 season.

Westchester Knicks (2017)
On February 3, 2017, Jenkins was acquired by the Westchester Knicks of the NBA Development League.

Return to Atlanta (2017)
On September 25, 2017, Jenkins signed with the Atlanta Hawks, returning to the franchise for a second stint. He was waived before the regular season by the Hawks on October 6, 2017.

San Pablo Burgos (2017–2018)
On November 7, 2017, Jenkins signed with Spanish club San Pablo Burgos for his first professional experience in Europe.

Westchester Knicks (2018–2019)
In October 2018, Jenkins was added to the Westchester Knicks training camp roster.

Washington Wizards (2019)
On January 30, 2019, Jenkins signed a 10-day contract with the Washington Wizards.

New York Knicks (2019)
On February 11, 2019, Jenkins signed a 10-day contract with the New York Knicks, and on February 21, his contract was converted on a permanent basis.

Jiangsu Dragons (2020)
On January 6, 2020, Jenkins was reported to have joined the Jiangsu Dragons.

Hapoel Eilat (2020)
On February 26, 2020, he has signed with Hapoel Eilat of the Israeli Premier League.

Bilbao Basket (2020–2021)
On December 15, 2020, he has signed a 2-months contract with RETAbet Bilbao Basket of the Liga ACB. Jenkins averaged 12.6 points, 1.7 rebounds, and 1.2 assists per game.

BCM Gravelines-Dunkerque (2021–2022)
On August 29, 2021, Jenkins signed with BCM Gravelines-Dunkerque of the LNB Pro A.

NBA G League Ignite (2022–present)
On September 28, 2022, Jenkins signed with the NBA G League Ignite.

NBA career statistics

Regular season

|-
| style="text-align:left;"|
| style="text-align:left;"|Atlanta
| 61 || 2 || 14.8 || .446 || .384 || .843 || 1.5 || .9 || .2 || .2 || 6.1
|-
| style="text-align:left;"|
| style="text-align:left;"|Atlanta
| 13 || 0 || 12.2 || .381 || .222 || 1.000 || 1.7 || .8 || .1 || .1 || 3.1
|-
| style="text-align:left;"|
| style="text-align:left;"|Atlanta
| 24 || 3 || 12.4 || .495 || .404 || .842 || 1.6 || .5 || .4 || .0 || 5.6
|-
| style="text-align:left;"|
| style="text-align:left;"|Dallas
| 21 || 1 || 9.2 || .414 || .158 || .889 || 1.0 || .4 || .1 || .0 || 3.3
|-
| style="text-align:left;"|
| style="text-align:left;"|Phoenix
| 22 || 2 || 13.0 || .467 || .406 || .800 || 1.6 || 1.2 || .2 || .0 || 5.0
|-
| style="text-align:left;"|
| style="text-align:left;"|Phoenix
| 4 || 0 || 3.3 || .400 || .500 || 1.000 || .3 || .3 || .0 || .0 || 1.8
|-
| style="text-align:left;"|
| style="text-align:left;"|Washington
| 4 || 0 || 3.5 || 1.000 || 1.000 || - || .3 || .3 || .0 || .0 || 1.5
|-
| style="text-align:left;"|
| style="text-align:left;"|New York
| 22 || 0 || 14.5 || .388 || .357 || .833 || 1.6 || 1.0 || .0 || .1 || 5.2
|-
| style="text-align:center;" colspan="2"|Career || 171 || 8 || 12.8 || .441 || .367 || .847 || 1.5 || .8 || .2 || .1 || 5.0

Playoffs

|-
| style="text-align:left;"|2013
| style="text-align:left;"|Atlanta
| 4 || 0 || 6.0 || .000 || .000 || .000 || .5 || .8 || .0 || .0 || .0
|-
| style="text-align:left;"|2015
| style="text-align:left;"|Atlanta
| 4 || 0 || 5.3 || .667 || .500 || .000 || .8 || .0 || .0 || .0 || 2.5
|-
| style="text-align:center;" colspan="2"|Career || 8 || 0 || 5.6 || .444 || .400 || .000 || .6 || .8 || .0 || .0 || 1.3

Awards and honors
 2× Tennessee Mr. Basketball (2008, 2009)
 Third-team Parade All-American (2009)
 Reebok All-American (2009)
 Named to the SEC All-Freshman team and Sixth Man of the Year by the league's coaches in 2009–10
 First-team All-SEC selection by the league's coaches and media in 2010–11 and in 2011–12
 Associated Press third-team All-American in 2011–12

Personal life
He is the son of John Jenkins Jr. and Melodye Jenkins and has a sister, Adrianne. He majored in Interdisciplinary Studies with a focus in Religious Studies. Jenkins and his wife have a daughter.

See also
 List of NCAA Division I men's basketball season 3-point field goal leaders

References

External links

Vanderbilt Commodores bio

1991 births
Living people
African-American basketball players
All-American college men's basketball players
American expatriate basketball people in Spain
American men's basketball players
Atlanta Hawks draft picks
Atlanta Hawks players
Bakersfield Jam players
Basketball players from Tennessee
BCM Gravelines players
Capital City Go-Go players
CB Miraflores players
Dallas Mavericks players
Fort Wayne Mad Ants players
Idaho Stampede players
Liga ACB players
NBA G League Ignite players
New York Knicks players
Parade High School All-Americans (boys' basketball)
People from Hendersonville, Tennessee
Phoenix Suns players
Shooting guards
United States men's national basketball team players
Vanderbilt Commodores men's basketball players
Washington Wizards players
Westchester Knicks players